Cryptodaphne adiaphora is a species of sea snail, a marine gastropod mollusk in the family Raphitomidae.

Description
The length of the shell attains 5.6 mm.

Distribution
This marine species occurs at bathyal depths off the Fiji Islands

References

 Morassi, M. & Bonfitto, A. (2010) New raphitomine gastropods (Gastropoda: Conidae: Raphitominae) from the South-West Pacific. Zootaxa, 2526:54-68

External links
 Gastropods.com: Cryptodaphne adiaphora

adiaphora
Gastropods described in 2010